Wonders & Worries is a nonprofit organization (501(c)(3)) based in Austin, Texas, that provides professional support for children through a parent's illness, such as cancer, multiple sclerosis, diabetes, Lou Gehrig's disease, posttraumatic stress disorder and Alzheimer's disease.

Services are provided without charge in English or Spanish by a Certified Child Life Specialist to families in Central Texas. Pilot programs have been implemented in Raleigh, North Carolina;  Ottawa, Canada; and San Antonio, Texas.  A randomized clinical trial for the organization's curriculum is underway.

History

Wonders & Worries was launched with the support of the Lance Armstrong Foundation (LAF), which provided funding in spring 2001 to conduct a pilot support group for children who had a parent with cancer. LAF provided an additional grant in fall 2001 to expand services to include a school-age support group, an adolescent support group, individual counseling for children who have a parent with cancer, and quarterly social functions to reunite Wonders & Worries clients.

Services

Individual Sessions: for children aged 2–18yrs

Group Sessions: helping children aged 5+ meet other children coping with similar experiences

Child/Parent Relationship Training Classes: teaching parents how to reconnect with their children during an illness or following a loss

Informal Support / Recreational Group Activities – allowing families to enjoy being together in a fun, relaxing environment

Bereavement Support Sessions – helping families prepare for the end of life and gain skills that will help them cope with the loss

See also 
 Child Life Specialist
 Childhood bereavement
 Posttraumatic stress disorder (PTSD)

References

External links 

 Official website

Counseling organizations
Medical and health organizations based in Texas
Cancer charities in the United States
Organizations based in Austin, Texas
501(c)(3) organizations